Agnee is a 1988 Indian Hindi-language film directed by J Om Prakash, starring Mithun Chakraborty, Chunky Pandey, Amrita Singh, Mandakini, Moushumi Chatterjee, Anupam Kher and Alok Nath.

Plot

Given up for dead, separated from his beloved wife Sonali, Pramod returns to his home town, only to see the funeral of his wife. Pramod is the victim of Sekhawat who had plotted his murder to get his share of the inheritance. In the intervening years Amit has grown up in a decent and cultured family and become a doctor. Amit and Babla, Sekhawat's son are good friends. One day Pramod takes shelter in Amit's place and there he discovers that Amit is his own son. Pramod is burning with revenge but he is reluctant to involve his son. But fate conspires to make Amit realize that his father has suffered for 25 years. On the other hand, Sekhawat kidnaps Tara, the lover of Amit and tries to molest her, but at that time Sekhawat's wife kills her husband and then herself. All thereby ends happily.

Cast
 Mithun Chakraborty as Amit
 Amrita Singh as Tara
 Anupam Kher as Shekawat
 Tanuja as Amit's foster mother
 Chunky Pandey as Babla
 Mandakini as Aayushi 
 Moushmi Chatterjee as Shobha
 Asrani as Bhimsen
 Satyen Kappu as Tara's father
 Kiran Kumar as Sheru Menghi
 Anjana Mumtaz as Sonali
 Shafi Inamdar as Amit's foster father
 Rajesh Puri as Kishorilal 
 Alok Nath as Pramod
 Sudhir Dalvi as Pandit
 Jamuna as Roopa
 Mukri 
 Master Sharan Chopra as Sunny

Soundtrack

References

External links
 
  -
 https://web.archive.org/web/20111127032928/http://www.bollywoodhungama.com/movies/cast/5114/index.html

1988 films
1980s Hindi-language films
Films scored by Laxmikant–Pyarelal
Films directed by J. Om Prakash